George Bradbury (died 1696), was a senior English judge who was also a Protestant, he thrived under the absolutist monarchy, but was punished during the Glorious Revolution for past association with the notorious Judge Jeffreys.

Youth and education
Bradbury was the eldest son of Henry Bradbury of St. Martin's Fields, Middlesex. Of his early years nothing is known. He was admitted a member of the Middle Temple on 28 June 1660, was created a master of arts by the university of Oxford 28 Sept. 1663, and was called to the bar on 17 May 1667.

Career
For some time his practice in court was inconsiderable. He first occurs as junior counsel against Lady Ivy in a suit in which she asserted her title to lands in Shadwell, 3 June 1684. The deeds upon which she relied were of doubtful authenticity, and Bradbury won commendation from Chief Justice Jeffreys who was trying the case, for ingeniously pointing out that the date which the deeds bore described Philip and Mary, in whose reign they purported to have been executed, by a title which they did not assume till some years later. But the judge's temper was not to be relied upon. Bradbury repeating his comment, Jeffreys broke out upon him: "Lord, sir! you must be cackling too; we told you your objection was very ingenious, but that must not make you troublesome. You cannot lay an egg but you must be cackling over it."

Bradbury's name next occurs in 1681, when he was one of two trustees of the marriage settlement of one of the Carys of Tor Abbey. His position in his profession must consequently have been considerable, and in December 1688, when the chiefs of the bar were summoned to consult with the peers upon the political crisis surrounding the succession to the throne, Bradbury was among the number. In the July of the year following he was assigned by the House of Lords as counsel to defend Sir Adam Blair, Dr. Elliott, and others, who were impeached for dispersing proclamations of King James. The impeachment was, however, abandoned. On 9 July, upon the death of Baron Carr, he was appointed to the bench of the court of exchequer, and continued in office until his death, which took place 12 February 1696. The last judicial act recorded of him is a letter preserved in the treasury in support of petition of the Earl of Scarborough, 19 April 1695.

References

External links 

 

Year of birth missing
1696 deaths
17th-century English judges
Lawyers from London